The AN/PRC-150(C) Falcon II Manpack Radio, is a tactical HF-SSB/ VHF-FM manpack radio manufactured by Harris Corporation. It holds an NSA certification for Type 1 encryption.

The designation AN/PRC translates to Army/Navy Portable Radio Communications, according to Joint Electronics Type Designation System guidelines.

Users
The AN/PRC-150(C) radio is currently in use with the United States Army, United States Special Operations Command as well as within the US Marine Corps and United States Air Force.

Specifications

General
Frequency Range: 1.6 to 59.999 MHz
Net Presets: 75, fully programmable
Frequency Stability ±0.5 x 10–6
Emission Modes: J3E (single sideband, upper or lower, suppressed carrier telephony), H3E (compatible AM single sideband plus full carrier), A1A, J2A (compatible CW), selectable; F3E (FM)
RF Input/Output Impedance: 50 Ω nominal, unbalanced
Power Input: 26 VDC (21.5 to 32 VDC)
Data Interface: Synchronous or asynchronous (RS-232C; MIL-STD-188-114A)
Dimensions (with battery case): 10.5W x 3.5H x 13.2D inches (26.7W x 8.1H x 34.3D cm)
Radio Weight: 10 lb (4.7 kg) without batteries
 Model: RT-1694D (P)(C)/U

Receiver
Sensitivity SSB: –113 dBm (0.5 µV) minimum for 10 dB SINAD
Audio Output: 15 mW at 1000 Ω to external handset
Squelch: Front panel adjustable, active squelch selectable
IF Rejection: Greater than 80 dB
Image Rejection: Greater than 80 dB (First IF image)
Intermodulation Distortion: –80 dB or better for two –30-dBm signals separated 30 kHz or more
Overload Protection: Receiver protected to 32 VRMS..

Transmitter
Power Output: 1, 5, 20 watts PEP/Average -1/+2 dB (1, 5, 10 watts FM)
Audio Input: 1.5 mV at 150 Ω or 0 dBm at 600 Ω for full rated output
Carrier Suppression: Greater than 60 dB below PEP output (J3E mode)
Undesired Sideband Suppression: Greater than 60 dB below PEP output
Spurious Outputs: –50 dB relative to rated output, except harmonics which are –40 dB (Greater than 20 kHz from Fc) Minimum for fo = 1.6-30 MHz
Antenna Tuning Capability: OE-505 10-foot (3 m) whip (1.6 to 60 MHz), RF-1936P (AS-2259) NVIS (1.6 to 30 MHz), RF-1940-AT001/RF-1941 dipole

Environmental
Test Method: Per MIL-STD-810E
Immersion: 3 ft. (0.9 m) of water
Operating temperature: –40 °C to +70 °C

HF Features
Encrypted Data HF: MIL-STD-188-110B App. C (9600 bit/s and 12,800 bit/s uncoded), App. B 39 tone (to 2400 bit/s), Serial Tone (to 9600 bit/s), STANAG 4285 (2400 bit/s), STANAG 4415 (75 bit/s), STANAG 4539 (9600 bit/s), FSK (600 bit/s)
VHF: FSK (16 kbit/s)
Automatic Link Establishment (ALE): STANAG 4538 FLSU, MIL-STD-188-141B Appendix A with Appendix B AL-1 LP, including the Scope Command telephony call type 
Frequency hopping: Serial Tone ECCM
Vocoder: HF LPC-10-52E (600/2400) MELP (600/2400), VHF: CVSD
Data Link Layer Protocol (ARQ): STANAG 4538 (3G), pFED-STD-1052

VHF Features
Data: Wideband FSK (16 kbit/s)
Voice Digitization: CVSD (16 kbit/s)

COMSEC Interoperability
ANDVT/KY-99, ANDVT/KY-100, KG-84C, KY-57 VINSON (VHF), CITADEL (NSA approved exportable COMSEC)

See also
AN/PRC-152
AN/PRC-148
AN/PRC-117F

References

Military radio systems of the United States
Military electronics of the United States